Oxygonia is a genus of beetles in the family Cicindelidae, containing the following species:

 Oxygonia annulipes Bates, 1872 
 Oxygonia boucardi Chevrolat, 1881 
 Oxygonia buckleyi Bates, 1872 
 Oxygonia carissima Bates, 1872 
 Oxygonia delia (Thomson, 1859) 
 Oxygonia erichsoni W. Horn, 1898 
 Oxygonia fleutiauxi W. Horn, 1896 
 Oxygonia floridula Bates, 1872 
 Oxygonia gloriola Bates, 1872 
 Oxygonia kippenhani Schule, 2008 
 Oxygonia kondratieffi Kippenhan, 1997 
 Oxygonia moreti Deuve, 1992 
 Oxygonia moronensis Bates, 1872 
 Oxygonia nigricans W. Horn, 1926 
 Oxygonia nigrovenator Kippenhan, 1997 
 Oxygonia oberthueri W. Horn, 1896 
 Oxygonia onorei Cassola & Kippenhan, 1997 
 Oxygonia prodiga Erichson, 1847 
 Oxygonia schoenherri Mannerheim, 1837 
 Oxygonia uniformis W. Horn, 1900  
 Oxygonia vuillefroyi Chaudoir, 1869

References

Cicindelidae